Kenya competed at the 2007 World Championships in Athletics held at Nagai Stadium in Osaka, Japan from 24 August to 2 September 2007. Kenya won five gold, three silver and five bronze medals, finishing second in the medal table, after the United States.

Medalists

Results

Men 

800 metres
Alfred Yego - 1st (1:47.09)
Wilfred Bungei - 5th (1:47.42)
Justus Koech - Semifinals

1500 metres
Shedrack Kibet Korir - 3rd (3:35.04)
Asbel Kiprop - 4th (3:35.24)
Daniel Kipchirchir Komen - Semifinals

5000 metres
Eliud Kipchoge - 2nd (13:46.00)
Benjamin Limo - 15th (14:01.25)
Isaac Songok - Heats
Joseph Ebuya - Heats

10000 metres
Martin Mathathi - 3rd (27:12.17)
Josephat Ndambiri - 5th (27:31.41) 
Josphat Kiprono Menjo - 8th (28:25.67)

Marathon
Luke Kibet - 1st (2:15:59)
William Kiplagat - 8th (2:19:21)
Laban Kagika - 58th (2:37:13)
James Macharia - DNF
Laban Kipkemboi - DNF

3000 metres steeplechase
Brimin Kipruto - 1st (8:13.82) 	 
Ezekiel Kemboi - 2nd (8:16.94) 	 
Richard Mateelong - 3rd (8:17.5)

Women 

800 metres
Janeth Jepkosgei - 1st (1:56.04) 

1500 metres
Viola Kibiwot - 6th (4:02.10)
Veronica Nyaruai Wanjiru - Semifinals

5000 metres
Vivian Cheruiyot - 2nd (14:58.50)
Priscah Jepleting Cherono - 3rd (14:59.21)
Sylvia Kibet - 4th (14:59.26)

10000 metres
Philes Ongori - 8th (32:30.74)
Emily Chebet - 9th (32:31.21)
Evelyne Wambui Nganga - 19th (33:17.12)

Marathon
Catherine Ndereba - 1st (2:30:37)
Rita Jeptoo - 7th (2:32:03)
Edith Masai - 8th (2:32:22)
Rose Cheruiyot - 24th (2:38:56)
Hellen Jemaiyo Kimutai - 25th (2:39:14)

3000 metres steeplechase
Eunice Jepkorir - 3rd (9:20.09)
Ruth Bosibori - 4th (9:25.25) WJR

References 
IAAF - Osaka 2007

Nations at the 2007 World Championships in Athletics
Athletics
Kenya at the World Championships in Athletics